Council of Christian Hospitals (COCH), an autonomous body that facilitates management of medical institutions founded by Missionaries of Canadian Baptist Mission.  COCH is a body corporate under Indian Societies Registration Act and has its registered office in premises of one of its participating hospitals, that is, CBM Christian Medical Centre, Pithapuram in East Godavari District of Andhra Pradesh.

Formed on 13 April 1973, COCH sets an annual agenda in line with Missionary endeavour to serve the poor and the needy.  In terms of continuing education, COCH is one of the members of the Christian Medical College & Hospital, Vellore where two members office bearers of COCH comprising Chairperson and Secretary participate in Annual General Meeting of Association of Christian Medical College & Hospital in Vellore.  As a sponsoring body, COCH also communicates with members of Churches founded by Canadian Baptist Mission inviting applications for possible sponsorship to eligible students to study health-related courses at Christian Medical College & Hospital in Vellore.

COCH is represented at ecumenical forums as a member of Christian Medical Association of India, an affiliated institution of National Council of Churches in India comprising members from Protestant and Orthodox Churches in India.

Background
Baptist missionaries from Canada first came to Ramayapatnam in 1868 in southern Andhra Pradesh working along with American Baptist missionaries.  On invitation extended by Indian Missionary, Thomas Gabriel who was involved in propagating Gospel in parts of East Godavari, West Godavari and Krishna districts along northern coastal line of Andhra Pradesh., Canadian Baptist Mission began sending Missionaries to India in 1874 to partner with Thomas Gabriel.  Apart from Church-related ministries of evangelism and leadership training, there was also development ministries that included aiding people in agricultural, health and educational development.

In addition to intervention among Telugus in Andhra Pradesh, the missionaries also covered southern Odisha working among Soura, Kui and Odiya and later in 1922, Serango Christian Hospital was opened in Gajapati District, Odisha.

William Gordon Carder, formerly Professor of Church History at Andhra Christian Theological College, Hyderabad wrote that it was Dr. E. G. Smith who could be termed as first Medical Missionary from Canadian Baptist Mission who was sent to India in 1894. During the ensuing years', a total of eight hospitals were founded by Canadian Baptist Mission.

Legal status
During latter half of nineteenth century, Missionaries entrusted leadership to their co-partners, the Indians, resulting in formation of Convention of Baptist Churches of Northern Circars (CBCNC) which had also Educational, Theological, and Medical Committees.  However, it was felt that Medical Committee be made autonomous and all medical institutions needed to be safeguarded and continued to be managed without any hindrances.  Therefore, Canadian Baptist Ministries, with bona fide motives entrusted properties of medical institutions founded by it to the custody of Evangelical Trust Association of South India (ETASI), Bangalore (Karnataka).  Further, on 13 April 1973, COCH was formed as an autonomous body to manage medical ministries of Canadian Baptist Ministries.

Supporters

Apart from the Canadian Baptist Ministries, the Hospitals and Nursing School of the COCH are partly funded by the following institutions:
 Christoffel Blinden Mission
 European Baptist Ministries
 Government of Andhra Pradesh – National Blindness Control Programme

Notes

Further reading
 
 
 
  II

External links
 Official site of Canadian Baptist Ministries 

 
   

Medical Council of India
Medical associations based in India
Hospital networks in India
Christian organisations based in India
Canadian Baptist Ministries